JDS Atsumi (LST-4101) was the lead ship of the s of the Japanese Maritime Self-Defense Force. She was commissioned on 27 November 1972.

Development and design
This gave them a maximum speed of 
.  

Vessels of the class carried two Landing Craft Vehicle Personnel (LCVPs). The LCVPs were slung under davits and a traveling gantry crane with folding rails that could be extended over the side handled the two LCMs positioned on the foredeck. The LSTs could carry up 130 troops. The Atsumi class were armed with twin-mounted  guns in a single turret placed each at the bow and aft. The LSTs were equipped with OPS-9 air search. They had a complement of 100 officers and crew.

Construction and career 
She was laid down by Sasebo Heavy Industries on 7 December 1971 as the No. 4101 planned transport ship in 1970 based on the 4th Defense Force Development Plan, launched on 13 June 1972, and launched on 27 November 1972. It was commissioned on the day and was incorporated into the Yokosuka District Force as a ship under direct control.

Engaged in disaster dispatch due to the eruption of Mt. Mihara, Izu Oshima in November 1986.

Engaged in disaster dispatch due to the Great Hanshin Earthquake in January 1995.

On 13 February 1998, she was decommissioned after 25 years. The total itinerary reached 345,823 nautical miles. As a substitute ship,  was incorporated into the Yokosuka District Force from the 1st Transport Corps.

Citations

External links

Atsumi-class tank landing ships
Ships built by Sasebo Naval Arsenal
1972 ships